Robert Lee Fulton Sikes (June 3, 1906September 28, 1994) was an American politician of the Democratic Party who represented the Florida Panhandle in the United States House of Representatives from 1941 to 1979, with a brief break in 1944 and 1945 for service during World WarII.

He served during a long period in which Florida was effectively a one-party state dominated by Democrats, as the Republican Party had been weakened by the disfranchisement of African Americans by racist policies and Jim Crow laws. The Republican Party began a resurgence in the 1970s.

In 1975 Sikes was accused by Common Cause of financial misconduct and was investigated and censured by the House in 1976. He did not seek re-election in 1978.

Early life and education

Born in Isabella, near Sylvester, Georgia, Sikes attended the public schools, which were segregated. He obtained his Bachelor of Science in 1927 from the University of Georgia at Athens, where he was a member of Alpha Gamma Rho fraternity. He went to Florida for graduate school, receiving a Master of Science in 1929 from the University of Florida at Gainesville.

Career

Sikes entered the publishing business in Crestview, in the Florida Panhandle near Destin and Fort Walton Beach, working in that field from 1933 to 1946.

He soon became active in politics, joining the Democratic Party, which was effectively the only party for whites in the state in the early part of his career. At the turn of the century, the Democratic-dominated legislature had passed a new constitution and laws that disenfranchised most African Americans, crippling the Republican Party, of which they had been the majority. Sikes was elected in 1936 to the Florida House of Representatives, during the Great Depression and a landslide year for the Democrats, aligned with the popular President Franklin D. Roosevelt. Sikes was re-elected, serving until 1940.

Sikes was elected in 1940 to the Seventy-seventh Congress from what was then the 3rd District, and was re-elected to a second term in the Seventy-eighth Congress. His victory followed a bitter Democratic primary campaign. As Florida was then essentially a one-party state, most races were effectively decided in the Democratic primary.

Sikes served from January 3, 1941, until his resignation on October 19, 1944, to enter the United States Army during World WarII. He was commissioned as a major. As a Congressman, Sikes had pressed for development in the state, including of Eglin Field as a test facility of the United States Army Air Forces, and later, the U.S. Air Force.

When President Franklin D. Roosevelt ordered all legislators on active duty to return to Washington, Sikes ran for his old seat in 1944 and won. He served in the 79th and sixteen succeeding Congresses. After the war, Sikes was selected as a delegate to the Interparliamentary Conference in Warsaw, Poland, in 1959.

Sikes was a signatory to the 1956 Southern Manifesto that opposed the desegregation of public schools ordered by the Supreme Court in Brown v. Board of Education.

Sikes was a colleague of representatives Courtney W. Campbell, a fellow Democrat, and William C. Cramer of St. Petersburg, who defeated Campbell in 1954 to become the first Republican elected in Florida to the House delegation since 1880 after Reconstruction.

Sikes's district, which was renumbered as the 1st District in 1963, began moving away from its Yellow Dog Democratic roots after World WarII. The district's voters began splitting their tickets as early as the 1950s, and voted for the Republican presidential candidate in every election from 1964 onward, except when the segregationist third-party candidacy of George Wallace won a majority in 1968. However, Sikes remained very popular at home. He never won less than 80 percent of the vote, and usually faced "sacrificial lamb" Republican challengers on the occasions he faced any opposition at all. In 1964, for instance, Sikes was reelected unopposed even as Barry Goldwater won the district by such a large margin it almost pushed Florida into the Republican column.

In Congress, Sikes became one of the most powerful men in Washington; he was often called "Florida's third Senator". He used his seniority to help build fourteen military bases in the Panhandle. He also had a reputation for strong constituent service, which garnered him the nickname "the He-Coon". Sikes said the nickname was derived from a Panhandle legend about a male raccoon that not only knew where food and water were, but also fended off his enemies and looked after his territory. As Sikes put it, a he-coon was expected to "look after those around him."

Along with Republican congressmen Jack Edwards of Alabama and Trent Lott of Mississippi, Sikes helped originate the Gulf Coast Congressional Report on WKRG-TV in Mobile, Alabama (the CBS affiliate for most of his district) in 1973. He left the program in 1979 upon his retirement.

Reprimand

In 1975, Common Cause, a public-affairs lobbying group, accused Sikes of using his office for personal gain. He owned stock in a Pensacola Naval Air Station bank that had been established by government officials at his urging, as well as in military contractor Fairchild Industries, which benefited from government contracts. He failed to disclose his interest in both these companies in the requisite financial reports. Sikes was reprimanded by a 381-3 vote of the House of Representatives on July 26, 1976, for the financial misconduct. Sikes, a strong conservative, believed "flaming liberals" had conspired against him.

Later years, death and legacy

Sikes did not seek reelection in 1978 to Congress, having never lost an election in 45 years as an elected official. Upon his political retirement, Sikes returned to Crestview and devoted himself to his business interests. He died on September 28, 1994.

The Bob Sikes Bridge, connecting Gulf Breeze to Santa Rosa Island, is named after him. 
Bob Sikes Airport near the city of Crestview, in Okaloosa County, is named for him.
Bob Sikes Elementary School, located in Crestview, Florida
The Robert LF Sikes Center, located in Crestview, Florida is named for him (part of Northwest Florida State College).
County Road 280, known as "Bob Sikes Road", connects U.S. Route 331 in DeFuniak Springs, FL to Florida State Road 285 in the west.

See also

List of federal political scandals in the United States
List of United States representatives expelled, censured, or reprimanded

References

External links

 

|-

|-

1906 births
1994 deaths
20th-century American politicians
Censured or reprimanded members of the United States House of Representatives
Democratic Party members of the United States House of Representatives from Florida
People from Crestview, Florida
People from Worth County, Georgia
United States Army officers
United States Army personnel of World War II
University of Florida alumni
University of Georgia alumni
American segregationists